Amelia Earhart is a 1976 American biographical drama television film directed by George Schaefer and written by Carol Sobieski. It stars Susan Clark as Amelia Earhart, and John Forsythe as her husband, George P. Putnam. Unlike more recent depictions of Earhart's life, this film makes an attempt to cover her entire life from her childhood on a Kansas farm, her nursing during World War I, an early boyfriend, employment at a Boston children's orphanage, her interest and exploits in aviation, her marriage to Putnam, and her famous disappearance in 1937.

The film was the first dramatization of Earhart's life and co-starred a parade of well-known actors of the time and originally premiered on NBC Monday Night at the Movies on October 25, 1976.

Plot
In 1907, when Amelia Earhart was nine years old growing up on a Kansas farm, she was an intelligent, precocious child and builds a play aircraft with her sister "Pidge". Later, as America enters World War I in 1917, Amelia is a college student, working in a doctor's office. She decides to join the war effort and become a nurse. One night on the roof of her building, while on break with a coworker, she sees an aircraft which re-sparks her childhood interest in aviation. In 1921, young Earhart has her first training flight, with female flight instructor, Neta Snook. That same year she buys her first aircraft, a Kinner "Canary" with the blessing of her father who has become a chronic alcoholic. In 1924, she and her mother drive from coast to coast, Los Angeles to Boston, in an open roadster, arguing some of the way. In Boston Earhart has an off-and-on relationship with a young man and later goes to work in a children's orphanage. What little money she saves subsidizes her flying.

In 1928, while in employ at the orphanage, Earhart is invited to become the first woman ever to fly the Atlantic in a fixed-wing aircraft, the Fokker "Friendship", albeit as a passenger, while pilot Wilmer Stultz and copilot Lou Gordon (Steve Kanaly) are at the controls. That same year she flies her Avro Avian biplane in a coast-to-coast, stop-and-go flight where some southern locals recognize her from the transatlantic Friendship flight. Her marriage to media tycoon George Palmer Putnam and a series of record-breaking flights, propel her to international fame as a long-distance flyer. Despite her open and frequently strained relationship with Putnam, she develops a close relationship with his son David. With help from a close friend and adviser, Paul Mantz, Earhart plans her longest flight ever, a round-the-world attempt in 1937. The disappearance of Earhart and her navigator Fred Noonan during the last stage of the flight, leads to a massive search effort that eventually proves fruitless, but solidifies Earhart as an aviation icon.

Cast
Susan Clark as Amelia Earhart
John Forsythe as George P. Putnam
Stephen Macht as Paul Mantz
Susan Oliver as Neta Snook/Snookie
Catherine Burns as Pidge Earhart
Jane Wyatt as Amy Earhart
Charles Aidman as Mr. Earhart
Eddie Barth as Sid Isaacs
Bill Vint as Fred Noonan (inaccurately written as "Fred Norman")
Jack Colvin as Wilmer Stultz
Steve Kanaly as Lou Gordon
John Archer as Dr. Paterson
Florida Friebus as Miss Perkins
Lance Kerwin as David Putnam
Kim Diamond as Young Amelia Earhart
Lowell Thomas as Broadcaster
Colleen Camp as Starlet
David Huffman as Itasca Radio Operator
Kip Niven as Allen Bradford(her boyfriend)
Kathleen O'Malley as Mrs Gallagher

Production
The film dramatized Earhart's life, but "refuses to speculate on the cause of Ms. Earhart's disappearance during a round-the-world trip in 1937"; however despite the lack of speculation "the clues that do exist are presented in full". Mainly staying close to the historical record, one departure is portraying stunt pilot Paul Mantz as her "purported lover", a long-standing rumor that has never been substantiated. Sobieski's screenplay drew on "her own experiences as a licensed pilot".

Principal photography took place at Camarillo Airport, California, with aerial sequences flown by well-known aerobatic pilot Art Scholl and Frank Tallman, owner of Tallmantz Aviation, a company primarily involved in flying for film and television production. A de Havilland Moth appeared in place of the Avro Avian that Earhart had purchased in England. A Lockheed 12A (S/N 1204), was featured as Earhart's famed Lockheed Model 10 Electra, used in the circumnavigational flight of the globe in 1937.

Reception
Interest in the story of Amelia Earhart, especially with the release of Amelia (2009) led film reviewers to recall the earlier Earhart portrayals. Rosalind Russell had played "an Earhart-esque flier in 1943's Flight for Freedom" and Diane Keaton starred in the 1994 TNT movie Amelia Earhart: The Final Flight. Susan Clark's performance compared favorably among the Earhart movies.

Amelia Earhart was nominated for a 1977 Emmy awards with William H. Tuntke (art director) and Richard Friedman (set decorator) nominated for Outstanding Art Direction or Scenic Design for a Dramatic Special; both Susan Clark and Susan Oliver were nominated for their work in the category of Actress in a Drama or Comedy Special, Clark for Outstanding Lead Actress and Oliver for Outstanding Performance by a Supporting Actress. The production was also nominated for the 1977 Golden Globe award for Best Motion Picture Made for TV.

Amelia Earhart was screened at the AFI/Los Angeles International Film Festival (AFI FEST salutes the television movie), June 18–July 2, 1992.

References
Notes

Bibliography

 Butler, Susan. East to the Dawn: The Life of Amelia Earhart. Reading, Massachusetts: Addison-Wesley, 1997. .
 Goldstein, Donald M. and Katherine V. Dillon. Amelia: The Centennial Biography of an Aviation Pioneer. Washington, DC: Brassey's, 1997. .
 Lovell, Mary S. The Sound of Wings: The Life of Amelia Earhart. New York: St. Martin's Press, 2009, First edition 1989. .
 Rich, Doris L. Amelia Earhart: A Biography. Washington, D.C.: Smithsonian Institution Press, 1989. .

External links
 
  allMovie/synopsis
 Amelia Earhart (1976) on Turner Classic Movies

1976 television films
1976 films
1976 drama films
1970s American films
1970s biographical drama films
1970s English-language films
American aviation films
American biographical drama films
American drama television films
Biographical films about aviators
Biographical television films
Cultural depictions of Amelia Earhart
Films directed by George Schaefer
Films scored by David Shire
Films set in the 1930s
Films shot in Ventura County, California
NBC network original films
Films with screenplays by Carol Sobieski